The Gotham Independent Film Award for Best International Feature is one of the annual Gotham Independent Film Awards and was first awarded in 2020, with Mexican-Spanish co-production Identifying Features, directed by Fernanda Valadez, being the first recipient of the award.

Winners and nominees

2020s

See also
 Academy Award for Best International Feature Film
 Independent Spirit Award for Best International Film

References

Best International Feature
Film awards for Best Foreign Language Film
Awards established in 2021